

Bangladesh Air Force

Bangladesh Army Aviation Group

Gallery

See also
 Bangabandhu Aeronautical Centre

References

Bangladesh Air Force historical aircraft list
Bangladesh Air Force
Military equipment of Bangladesh
Bangladesh military-related lists